Fashion is the style and custom prevalent at a given time.

Fashion may also refer to:

Film and television
 Fashion (2008 film), a Bollywood film directed by Madhur Bhandarkar
 Fashion Television (TV channel), a Canadian pay-television channel
 Fashion TV, a French-produced international television channel
 FashionTelevision, a Canadian-produced program

Music
 Fashion (band), a UK new wave band
 The Fashion, a Danish indie band
 The Fashion (album), a 2007 album by the band

Songs
 "Fashion" (David Bowie song), 1980
 "Fashion" (Hanoi Rocks song), 2007
 "Fashion", by Lady Gaga from Confessions of a Shopaholic: Original Soundtrack, 2009
 "Fashion!", by Lady Gaga from Artpop, 2013

Other media
 Fashion (magazine), a Canadian magazine
 The Fashion (website), a defunct fashion-site aggregator
Fashion, a play by Doug Lucie

Other uses
 Fashion (horse) (1837–1860), an American Thoroughbred racemare
 USS Fashion (ID-755), a United States Navy freight lighter 1918–1922

See also